The Legend of Mi Yue is a 2015 Chinese television series directed by Zheng Xiaolong and based on  eponymous historical novel. It stars Sun Li in the title role of Mi Yue. The series aired 2 episodes daily on Beijing TV and Dragon TV from 30 November 2015 to 9 January 2016.

Synopsis
This is a story about the tortuous life of Mi Yue, the first stateswoman and Queen Dowager in China's history.

Mi Yue was a young princess who lived in the Kingdom of Chu during the Warring States period. Her childhood was not peaceful, after witnessing her mother falling into the schemes of the Queen of Chu. Yet, she was on good relations with her sister, Mi Shu and her father, King Wei. She was eventually sent to Qin as a concubine as part of her sister's dowry, separating her from Huang Xie, her first love. Mi Yue gains the favor of King Ying Si and gives birth to a son named Ying Ji. This leads to the jealousy of Mi Shu, Wei Yan, the queen, and other concubines.

After King Ying Si passes away, Ying Dang becomes his successor. Mi Yue is sent as an ambassador (banishment) to the State of Yan with her son Ying Ji. However, King Ying Dang suddenly dies after lifting weights, leaving Qin in a state of chaos where Ying Si's sons are battling for the throne. Mi Yue enlists the help of the "barbarian" Yiqu army, successfully returning to Qin, suppressing political revolts and instates her son Ying Ji on the throne.

Cast

Main Characters
 Betty Sun as Mi Yue
Princess Yue of Chu (楚國公主)→Consort Mi (羋八子)→Mother of Qin (秦國質子之母)→Lord Consort of Yiqu (義渠王妃)→Queen Dowager Xuan of Qin (秦宣太后)
Liu Chutian as 4-5-years-old Princess Yue
Li Jing'er as 7-8-years-old Princess Yue
Chai Wei as 12-13-years-old Princess Yue
Most favourite daughter of King Wei of Chu, born from Concubine Xiang. Talented and highly perceptive, she was persecuted by the Queen of Chu since childhood due to an astrologer's prophecy. After the death of King Wei, she was rushed to the cemetery to guard her father's spirit and was ordered to only return after she grows up. She initially fell in love and agreed to marry Huang Xie, a renowned scholar and a bosom childhood friend, but for the sake of her half sister, Princess Shu's dowry, she instead married Ying Si, King Huiwen of Qin and bore him Ying Ji. After King Huiwen's death, she went to the State of Yan as a hostage along with her son and lived a live every aspect indistinguishable from death. After the actual death of Ying Dang, the King Wu of Great Qin, Queen Huiwen's only son, she married the Lord of Yiqu and with the help from his people, she installs her son as the new King and proclaimed herself as the Queen Dowager and later bore him Ying Fu.
 Liu Tao as Mi Shu
Grand Princess of Chu (楚國公主)→Queen of Great Qin (秦國王后)→Queen Huiwen of Great Qin (秦惠文后)
Li Nini as 6-years-old Grand Princess
Hao Yilin as 8-years-old Grand Princess
Daughter of King Wei of Chu from his Queen. Initially, she was a gentle and a kind girl who took Princess Yue everywhere and matched her and the Scholar Huang Xie when they were still in the Chu Palace. She fell in love with King Huiwen at first sight and later married him as she wished, but fell out of favor due to being framed, and later gave birth to Ying Dang, the later King Wu. Since Consort Mi and Madame Wei were increasingly favored by him, she got jealous and tried every means to deal with Consort Mi and her Son. Their sisterly relationship then broke down after Consort Mi comes into light about Queen Mi's schemes. After King Huiwen's death, she was crowned as Queen Hui and banished Consort Mi and her son to the State of Yan as a hostage while she arranged for hitmen and the locals to harm them. After her son, King Wu's death, she tried to help her grandson Prince Zhuang ascend the throne while creating chaos in the court in which she failed and was placed under house arrest by the Queen Dowager. Spent the rest of her life in Qingliang Hall (清涼殿) under constant supervision.
 Ma Su as Wei Yan
Lady Wei of Wei (魏士) → Madame Wei of Qin(魏夫人)
A Lady from the State of Wei, sister of Wei Zhang and aunt of Wei Yi. Ambitious, sinister and cunning,  she wants to become the Queen of Qin and hopes that her son will become the next King while she repeatedly targeting Mi Yue and Mi Shu. She later died at Yongcheng.
 Alex Fong as Ying Si
Prince Si (公子絲)→Crown Prince (太子)→ King of Qin (秦王)→ 𝘒𝘪𝘯𝘨 𝘏𝘶𝘪𝘸𝘦𝘯 𝘰𝘧 𝘘𝘪𝘯(秦惠文王)
A strategic, farsighted and a compassionate ruler with the ambition to conquer the world. He falls in love with Princess Yue and becomes the father of Ying Ji, born by Concort Mi, Ying Dang, born by Queen Mi and Ying Hua, born by Madame Wei. 
 Huang Xuan as Huang Xie
Lord Chunshen, the Prince of Chu (楚公子 春申君)
Gu Haofeng as 10-years-old Huang Xie
Ding Nan as 15/6-years-old Huang Xie
Qu Yuan's disciple who is loyal to his motherland. He is Mi Yue's first love and childhood sweetheart who accidentally fell off a cliff to save her right as they were about to elope and from that, he temporarily loses his memory. He mostly accompanies Crown Prince Heng of Chu and helps him ascend the throne. As Wei Choufu, he becomes a companion of the Queen Dowager Xuan. 
 Gao Yunxiang as Zhai Li
King of Yiqu (義渠王)→Lord of Yiqu (義渠君)
The ruler of Yiqu and Consort Mi's second husband—father of Prince Fu. His title of King was demoted to Lord (Jūn) after returning his land to the State of Qin. For his lifelong love towards Consort Mi, he is willing to bear the pain of wicked rituals for her. When the conflict between Yiqu and Qin gradually deepened, he then left the Qin Palace and with Huwei's help, he led troops into the Palace, but was shot to death by General Meng Yu with an arrow.

Supporting

State of Chu
 Winston Chao as King Wei of Chu
The ruler of the Chu State and father of Mi Huai, Mi Yin, Mi Shu, Mi Yue, Mi Rong. When he returned home gloriously after war, he learns from Mi Yue's mouth that Consort Xiang was sent out of the palace after being framed by the Queen. He then gave the queen a death sentence when he was furious and later angry due to his son's constant persuasion and died suddenly in the palace.
 Jiang Hongbo as Queen Wei of Chu
Primary wife of King Wei, Mi Huai and Mi Shu's biological mother who later given a death sentence.
Li Beilei as Dai Mao
A close-knit maid of Queen Wei who then followed Mi Shu to Qin State, guarding Mi Yue everywhere and was executed after framed Mi Yue to make she difficult for give birth.
 Jiang Xin as Consort Ju
Formerly the "Princess of the Ju State" (莒國公主) who becomes the favourite consort of King Wei and foster mother of Mi Yue and Mi Rong. After the King's death, she hanged herself to protect Mi Yue and Mi Rong from death.
 Sun Qian as Lady Xiang
"Madame Xiang" (向夫人)→"Consort Xiang" (向妃)
A dowry of Consort Ju, she then becomes the biological mother of Mi Yue, Mi Rong and Wei Ran. She was framed by the Queen and sent out of the palace, then contaminated and discouraged by the country while gave birth into Wei Ran. She was taken back to the palace by the King, but knew that she would not live long after returning to there, so she set up a situation to frame the queen by put poisonous wine in the queen's bottle and drank it by herself. When the King came, she told him that she was framed by the queen and died in anger.
 Tian Yixi as Zhen Zhu, Mi Shu's confidant.
 Liu Zihe as Shan Hu, Mi Shu's confidant who later committed suicide due to the killer bee incident.
 Ren Han as Lü Luo, pure-hearted woman who becomes Mi Shu's personal maid, but later beaten to death due to Mi Shu and King Ying Si.
 Cao Zheng as Mi Huai
"Crown Prince of Chu" (楚太子)→"King of Chu" (楚王)→"King Huai of Chu" (楚怀王)
Legitimate son of King Wei, from Queen Wei and a brother of Mi Shu. Although knows that his mother hates Mi Yue, he still sometimes speaks for her.
 Xu Fanxi as Mi Yin
"Princess (born from concubine) Yin of the Chu State" (楚國茵(庶)公主)→"Madame of Yan State" (燕國國相夫人)
 Su Chenxi as 8-years-old Mi Yin
Daughter of King Wei and Princess Wei who later becomes the wife of Guo Kui. During Mi Yue's stay in the Yan, she framed her many times before being poisoned by her own.
 Yuan Zhibo as Zheng Xiu
"Queen Nan" (南后)
King Huai's primary wife with a deep demeanor. She disagree with Queen Wei, knows that the queen hates Mi Yue which she deliberately help Mi Yue a lot.
 Lu Ying as Lian'er, Queen Nan's maid
 He Dujuan as Lady Wei
"Beauty Wei" (魏美人)
Wei State-born woman who was given to King Huai. Due to Queen Nan's jealousy, she is hidden at the remote Zhanghua Terrace (章華台). Gentle and simple, no scheming, good at dispelling depression, she is in good terms and befriends with Mi Yue. She didn't listen to Mi Yue's suggestion to guard against Queen Nan, manipulated by Queen Nan because of jealousy and subsequently King Huai had cut off her nose and thereafter committed suicide.
 Li Hongliang as Mi Rong
"Prince (born from concubine) of the Chu State" (楚國(庶)公子)→"Lord of Huayang" (華陽君)→"Lord of Xincheng" (新城君)
Li Qingyu as 2-years-old Mi Rong
Li Zekai as 7/8-years-old Mi Rong
Lou Zixuan as 11/2-years-old Mi Rong
Son of King Wei and Consort Xiang, also a younger brother of Mi Yue whom after her marriage to Qin, he stayed alone in Chu.
 Su Hang as Mi Heng, son of King Huai
"Crown Prince of Chu" (楚太子)→"King of Chu" (楚王)
Wu Bolin as 13-years-old Mi Heng
Zhou Qi as 16-years-old Mi Heng
Liu Xinyu as the "Little Princess of Chu State" (楚国小公主)
 Zu Feng as Qu Yuan, Prime minister of Chu.
 Jiang Feng as Jin Shang
A greedy and despicable man who becomes the Prime minister of Chu. As one of Zheng Xiu's confidant, he always opposed Qu Yuan.
Shi Yueling as a Female doctor
Bian Que's disciple with superb medical skills and good heart, she once delivered Mi Yue and her son when he was born. She followed Mi Shu married and stayed live in Qin. After Ying Dang's death, the political situation was still undecided, she then went up the mountain to collect medicine, but was killed by a rebellious army.
 Zheng Yecheng as Song Yu, a poem writer of Chu.
 Liu Yijun as Tang Mei
An astrologer who predicted the dominance theory, but Lady Xiang gave birth into a daughter, which King Wei dug out his eyes in anger. He later died to save Mi Yue.
 Sun Shuaihang as Zhao Yang
 Zhang Yujian as Tang Le
 Liu Ziming as Young Master Feng
 Xie Ziyi as Mi Qing

State of Qin
 Cai Wenyan as Lady Ying
"Madame Ying" (嬴夫人)
Adopted mother of Meng Ying. Initially was a crown princess of the Wei State, but since Qin win the war and she doing internal support in Wei, so she divorced by her husband (the current ruler of Wei) and lived in northern suburbs palace. She befriends Yong Rui and kept the edict for King Ying Xi, then died after Mi Shu set fire to the palace in order to force her to surrender the edict.
 Song Jialun as Ying Ji
Half brother of Ying Si who have no desire to fight for the throne and is deeply trusted by him. He later assist Ying Dang and Ying Ji.
 Xiao Hui as Lady Tang
"Madame Tang" (唐夫人)
Came from the State of Tang, she is the oldest member in Ying Si's harem who have been served as his consort since he was still a crown prince. Good-natured and honest, she is a good friend of Miyue, also the mother of Ying Huan.
 Tao Hui as Lady Guo
"Beauty Guo" (虢美人)
Came from the State of Guo, she is famous for her beauty among the consorts in the harem, but her personality is simpler and easy to be instigated by others. She actually wanted to frame Mi Shu, but accidentally hanged herself.
 Yin Xu as Lady Wei
"Virtuous Lady Wei" (卫良人)
Came from the State of Wey, she is the mother of Ying Feng ans Ying Chi. A smart and alert woman who is one of Mi Yue's good friend in the palace.
 Lan Xi as Lady Fan
"Junior Palace Woman Fan" (樊少使)→"Senior Palace Woman Fan" (樊長使)
Came from the State of Fan, she is the mother of Ying Tong. Timid and fearful woman who befriends with Mi Yue. After her son committed suicide, in front of King Ying Si, she firstly sued Mi Shu for the poisonous bee stinging case.
 Wei Yi as Lady Wei
"Junior Palace Woman Wei" (魏少使)→"Senior Palace Woman Wei" (魏長使)
Niece of Wei Yan and mother of Ying Zhuang. A sinister woman who is obeyed to her aunt's orders and hostile to Mi Shu, but later committed suicide to protect Madame Wei.
 Jing Xingwen as Kui Gu
Personal maid of Consort Ju who followed Mi Yue to Qin and later died during Mi Yue's stay in Yan for saved Ying Ji from the bees stung.
 Chen Chuyue as Xiang'er, Mi Yue's confidant
 Chen Yu as Hui'er, Mi Yue's confidant
 Zhang Ranyi as Cai Lü, Lady Wey's palace maid
 Xu Baihui as Lady Mengzhao
Niece of Zhao Yang from the Chu State and a maid of Mi Shu. Superficial and arrogant, she secretly colluded with Wei Yan while later sentenced to death by King Ying Si.
 Liu Yihong as Lady Jing
Jin Zhi as young Lady Jing
A woman born into a poor family who becomes a maid of Mi Shu alongside Meng Zhao.
 Chi Jia as Ying Hua
"Prince Hua" (公子華)Eldest son of King Ying Si, from Wei Yan. Talented and virtues, he is very devoted to Mi Yue and later led a group of soldiers to counter, but failed and beheaded by Mi Yue.
 Bao Luojun as Ying Hui
"Prince Hui" (公子恢)One of the royal prince of Qin who get killed by Ying Hua during the princes' chaos. 
 ... as Ying Huan
"Prince Huan" (公子奐)→"Marquess of Shu" (蜀侯)Son of King Ying Si and Lady Tang who later murdered by his subordinates.
 Liu Ziming as Ying Feng
"Prince Feng" (公子封)First son of King Ying Si and Lady Wey.
 Xue Yongyu as Ying Tong
"Prince Tong" (公子通)Son of King Ying Si and Lady Fan who had a good relationship with Ying Ji. He then committed suicide after suffered a lot of humiliation and bullying.
Cao Yingrui as 7/9-years-old Ying Tong
Lei Haowen as 11/2-years-old Ying Tong
 Gao Rui as 12-years-old Ying Zhuang
"Prince Zhuang" (公子壮)Son of King Ying Si and Lady Wei who was raised by Mi Shu. A conscientious man who later beheaded by Mi Yue for following Ying Hua's rebellion.
Huang Zuocan as 15-years-old Ying Zhuang
Chen Weichen as 20-years-old Ying Zhuang
 Ba Tu as Ying Dang
"Prince (born from queen) of the Qin State" (秦國嫡公子)→"Crown Prince of Qin" (秦太子)→"King of Qin" (秦王)→"King Wu of Qin" (秦武王)
Yu Tianyang as 2/4-years-old Ying Dang
Luqing Fuyuan as 7/9-years-old Ying Dang
Yang Jiahua as 10/2-years-old Ying Dang
King Ying Si's legitimate son, from Mi Shu. Loves contests, conquests, use of aggression and didn't like to study so his understanding of governance policies were limited. His policies was more based on physical prowess. He later married the Princess of the Wei State, Wei Yi and ascended the throne as the new King to succeed his father, but died in Luoyang while showing off his physical prowess after reigning for just about three years.
 Zhu Yilong as Ying Ji
"Prince (born from concubine) of the Qin State" (秦國庶公子)→"Proton of the Qin State" (秦國質子)→"King of Qin" (秦王)→"King Zhaoxiang of Qin" (秦昭襄王)
Zhang Haoting as 2/3-years-old Ying Ji
Shiyue Anxin as 6/8-years-old Ying Ji
Chen Hongjin as 9/12-years-old Ying Ji
Youngest son of King Ying Si and Mi Yue who is clever since child and has a kingly appearance. During his first ascended to the throne at a young age, his mother took charge of the royal administration and later married the Princess of the Chu State, Mi Yao and had a son named Ying Zhu.
 Xu Luyang as Ying Zhu, Son of Ying Ji and Mi Yao.
 Ma Sichun as Wei Yi
"Princess of the Wei State" (魏國公主)→"Crown Princess of Qin" (秦太子妃)→"Queen of Qin" (秦王后)→"Queen Wu of Qin" (秦武王后)
Daughter of the King of the Wei State and a niece of Wei Yan who becomes the primary wife of Ying Dang and later his queen following his ascension to the throne. After the troubles of the princes were settled, Mi Yue sent her back to her homeland, the Wei State.
 Sun Yi as Mi Yao
"Princess (born from concubine) of the Chu State" (楚國庶公主)→"Queen of Qin" (秦王后)
Daughter of King Huai of Chu and Beauty Zhao. As they were disliked by Zheng Xiu, so they suffered a lot of grievances in the Chu Palace. Gentle and considerate, she is good at cooking, but later died due to the Shoulder dystocia.
 Shi Jingming as Shang Yang
"Lord Shang of the Qin State" (秦国商君)Sentenced to die after Ying Si ascended the throne.
 Zhao Lixin as Zhang Yi
Initially a doorman of Yin Zhaoyang in the  Chu State, but due to the theft, he was under suspicion and was beaten brutally. He has since become discouraged with Chu State. He was a good strategist and assisted King Ying Si with his gift of talking and often secretly helped Mi Yue. After Ying Dang ascended the throne, he resigned due to his disharmony with the new king and return to his homeland the Wei State, where he died shortly afterwards.
 Gong Zheng as Yong Rui
A nobleman from the Yong State who becomes a confidant of King Ying Si and Madame Ying. Eventually helping Mi Yue as she becomes the Empress Dowager.
 Jin Tiefeng as Gan Mao
The official worshiped the right minister of Qin State. He befriended Mi Shu and Ying Dang, provoked the relationship between Mi Shu and Mi Yue, then fled to Wei State.
 Cao Weiyu as Gongsun Yan
A great alliance of King Ying Si in opposition to Zhang Yi. He collaborated with the Yiqu peoples to hijack the welcoming convoy and fled to the Wei State after his deeds were revealed.
 Li Junfeng as Sima Cuo
The famous general of the Qin State who has led Qin to victory many times and Wei Ran's mentor which is at odds with Gan Mao.
 Sun Boyang as Meng Ao
The famous general of the Qin State who escorted Mi Shu to get married with Qin. He is disgusting yet kind.
 Zhang Junhan as Wei Ran
"Major General" (裨将军)→"Ranghou" (穰侯)→"State Minister of the Qin State" (秦國國相)
Yin Ronghao as 5-years-old Wei Ran
Yue Xunyu as 9/12-years-old Wei Ran
He defiled Lady Xiang and she then gave birth to his son, which Mi Yue depended on each other for fate.
 Zeng Hongchang as Bai Qi
"Warlord of Yiqu" (義渠戰將)→"Lord Wu of An" (武安君)→"Grand Official of the Qin State" (秦國大良造)
Yang Yanduo as 9-years-old Bai Qi
Qiu Muyuan as 15-years-old Bai Qi
Initially lived with the Yiqu peoples, but late mixed into the wolves and knew the habits of human beings but did not understand the human language. He often led the wolves to Yiqu for steal sheep. He is recognized as Mi Yue's younger brother, changed his name into "Xiao Lang" (小狼) and taken care of by King Yiqu. He then follow Wei Ran and becomes a general in the Qin State.
 Xu Wenguang as Mu Jian
A eunuch next to King Ying Si. He is resourceful and resourceful, helped Mi Yue many times and was forced to death by Mi Shu not long after Ying Si died.
 An Xiaoge as Mu Xin
Mu Jian's apprentice who later becomes Mi Yue's confidant and served her, also became a eunuch next to Mi Yue and Ying Ji.
 Liu Tingzuo as Feng Jia
A godson of Mu Jian and a confidant of Mi Shu and Ying Dang who is very scheming while later betrays them.
... as Ying Chi
"Prince Chi" (公子池)Younger son of King Ying Si and Lady Wey, also Ying Feng's full younger brother who later surrender to Ying Ji.
... as Ying Yong
"Prince Yong" (公子雍)Second son of King Ying Si who later surrender to Ying Ji.

Yiqu peoples
Hai Zi as Hu Wei
Zhai Li's number one subordinate with a fierce and impulsive demeanor, but is very loyal to him. He was once saving Zhai Li and close to him as a brother.
Kong Qingsan as an Old witch
The old member of Yiqu who knows sacrificial rituals, can divination, understand ghosts and gods, and is respected by the whole peoples of Yiqu. He is Zhai Li's military adviser.

State of Yan
Mao Junjie as Meng Ying
"Queen Yi of Yan" (燕易王后), former Princess of the Qin State who married with King Yi of Yan.
 ... as King Zhao of Yan, son of Meng Ying.
Niu Baojun as Guo Kui, Minister of Yan State who becomes the husband of Mi Yin.
Yu Siqiong as Ling'er, Mi Yin's maid who helped Mi Yue privately many times and later exposed Mi Yin's evil deeds.
Yang Kun as Wu Po, an enthusiastic for helping others, introducing her work and Zhen Sao's residence to Mi Yue.
Yang Kaichun as Zhen Sao, a woman in Yan state's West City who later killed in a dispute between officers and soldiers sent by Mi Yin to frame Mi Yue.

Others
 Zhang Xiaoheng as Su Qin, Prime Minister of the Six States and lover of Meng Ying.
Qiao Han as Su Dai, younger brother of Su Qin.
Li Jiao as the fake Mi Shu, a cooking girl.
Dong Danjun as a Beekeeper who once helped Huang Xie when he is amnesia.
Jiang Wenli as the Beekeeper's wife
Ta La as King Nan of Zhou, last ruler of Eastern Zhou who is weak and sick. 
Tan Yang as Lin Xiangru, Prime Minister of the Zhao state.
Xiao Yating as Mei'er

Production
Filming started on September 6, 2014 and ended on 29 January 2015. The television series took place in Inner Mongolia, Zhuzhou, Beijing Expo Park, Xiangshan, and Hengdian World Studios.

Soundtrack
Mainland Chinese

Reception
The series initially attracted attention due to its predecessor, Empresses in the Palace, which is also directed by Zheng Xiaolong and stars Sun Li. During its broadcast, it attained high ratings and over 20 billion views online. However, the series did not receive the same critical acclaim and only has a Douban score of 5.5/10. Viewers feel that the plot of Mi Yue, which involves court intrigue between queens and concubines, was no longer fresh. The series has also been criticized for historical inaccuracies, plot (inconsistency and slow pace) and production quality.

Controversy
The production team of the series sued Jiang Shengnan, a scriptwriter on the show, for violating her contract. Jiang had published her novel, a 7,000-character section of The Legend of Mi Yue, online in August 2015 before the series aired. Jiang was dissatisfied with the production team for not recognizing her contributions to the show. The Beijing Chaoyang District Court ruled in favor of the production team. This sparked a discussion about authors writing scripts for adaptations on screen in China.

Ratings

Awards and nominations

Broadcast

International broadcast

See also
The Legend of Zhen Huan (2011)
Ruyi's Royal Love in the Palace (2017)

References

External links

Chinese historical television series
2015 Chinese television series debuts
Television series set in the Qin dynasty
Television series set in the Zhou dynasty
Television series about China
Television shows based on Chinese novels
Dragon Television original programming
Television series set in the 4th century BC